Porquerolles, also known as the Île de Porquerolles, is an island in the Îles d'Hyères, Var, Provence-Alpes-Côte d'Azur, France.

The south coast is lined with cliffs, and on the north coast are the port and the beaches of Notre Dame, La Courtade and Plage d'Argent.

History

The island's village was established in 1820, with its lighthouse constructed in 1837 and church in 1850. The entire island was purchased in 1912 by François Joseph Fournier, apparently as a wedding present for his wife; he planted  of vineyards, which produced a wine that was among the first to be classified as vin des Côtes de Provence.

In 1971, the state bought 80 percent of the island to preserve it from development. Much of the island is now part of a national park (the Port-Cros Parc National) and nature conservation area (Conservatoire botanique national méditerranéen de Porquerolles).

Some scenes of the film  Pierrot le fou , by Jean-Luc Godard (1965) were filmed in Porquerolles.

Since 2010, the island also hosts a jazz festival each summer ("Jazz à Porquerolles").

Climate
Porquerolles has a hot-summer Mediterranean climate (Köppen climate classification Csa).

Points of interest 
 Conservatoire botanique national méditerranéen de Porquerolles
 Port-Cros Parc National

References 

 Site officiel de Porquerolles
 ProvenceWeb: Ile de Porquerolles
 Port-Cros Parc National

Îles d'Hyères
Landforms of Var (department)
Populated places established in 1820
Tourist attractions in Var (department)
French Riviera
Mediterranean islands
Islands of Provence-Alpes-Côte d'Azur